The 2001 IIHF World Championship Final was an ice hockey match that took place on 13 May 2001 in Hanover, Germany, to determine the winner of the 2001 IIHF World Championship. The Czech Republic defeated Finland to win its fourth championship.

Details

See also 
 2001 IIHF World Championship
 Czech Republic men's national ice hockey team
 Finland men's national ice hockey team

References 
Official IIHF game report
Archive of the 2001 IIHF World Championship

Final
IIHF World Championship Finals
Czech Republic men's national ice hockey team games
Finland men's national ice hockey team games
World
World
Sports competitions in Hanover
21st century in Hanover
2000s in Lower Saxony